Kamaal Sait (born in South Africa) is a South African retired footballer.

Career

During his playing days, Sait was regarded as one South Africa's best utility players.

In 2002, he returned to Santos but was red-carded on debut against Black Leopards in the MTN 8.

In 2004, Sait retired because coaches deemed him to old to play despite being only 32 years old.

References

South African soccer players
Living people
Association football defenders
Association football midfielders
Year of birth missing (living people)